DNW may refer to:

 Diocese of New Westminster (Anglican), one of six dioceses of the Ecclesiastical Province of British Columbia and the Yukon
 Do not want, an internet meme
 Noonans Mayfair, formerly Dix Noonan Webb

See also 
 dnw, ISO 639-3 code of the Western Dani language